Kazankov is a Russian masculine surname, its feminine counterpart is Kazankova. It may refer to
Maksim Kazankov (born 1987), Russian and Turkmen football player
Marina Kazankova (born 1981), Russian actress and freediver
Sergey Kazankov (born 1972), Russian politician
 (born 1957), Soviet footballer

Russian-language surnames